Igor Rataj (born 3 November 1973, in Poprad) is a Slovak professional ice hockey player who played with HC Slovan Bratislava in the Slovak Extraliga.

He also played for HK Poprad, Amur Khabarovsk, HC Bílí Tygři Liberec, HC Znojemští Orli, HC Plzeň, HC Slavia Praha and HC Košice.

Career statistics

References

Living people
Amur Khabarovsk players
EK Zell am See players
HC Bílí Tygři Liberec players
HC Slovan Bratislava players
HC Slavia Praha players
HC Košice players
HC Plzeň players
HK Poprad players
MHK Kežmarok players
MHC Martin players
MsHK Žilina players
Orli Znojmo players
Slovak ice hockey forwards
1973 births
Sportspeople from Poprad
Slovak expatriate ice hockey players in the Czech Republic
Slovak expatriate sportspeople in Austria
Expatriate ice hockey players in Austria